Per Olav Tyldum (born 24 April 1964) is a Norwegian politician.

He was elected representative to the Storting from the constituency of Nord-Trøndelag for the period 2021–2025, for the Centre Party. Tyldum has earlier been mayor in Overhalla.

References

1964 births
Living people
Centre Party (Norway) politicians
Politicians from Nord-Trøndelag
Members of the Storting
Mayors of places in Norway